Riverside may refer to:

Places

Australia 
 Riverside, Tasmania, a suburb of Launceston, Tasmania

Canada 
 Riverside (electoral district), in the Yukon
 Riverside, Calgary, a neighbourhood in Alberta
 Riverside, Manitoba, a former rural municipality
 Riverside, Middlesex County, Ontario, a community in the municipality of Southwest Middlesex
 Rural Municipality of Riverside No. 168, Saskatchewan
 Riverside, Ontario, a neighbourhood of Windsor
 Riverside, Simcoe County, Ontario, a community in the township of Tay
 Riverside, Toronto, a neighbourhood in Riverdale, Toronto, Ontario
 Riverside Ward, former name of River Ward in Ottawa, Ontario

New Zealand
 Riverside, New Zealand, a locality in Ashburton District, near Wheatstone, New Zealand
 Riverside, Whangārei, a suburb of Whangārei

United Kingdom 
 Riverside, Cardiff, an inner-city area and community in Wales
 Riverside (Cardiff electoral ward)
 Riverside (Liverpool ward), a city council ward in England
 Riverside, Newport, a mixed residential and commercial area in South Wales
 Riverside (Norwich), a city neighborhood in Norfolk, England
 Riverside, Stirling, a district of the Stirling council area, Scotland
 Riverside, Worcestershire, a district of Redditch, England
 Riverside (music venue), in Newcastle upon Tyne, England, 1985–1999
 Riverside Stadium, in Middlesbrough, England
 Barking Riverside, a town in London, England

United States

 Riverside, Alabama, a town in St. Clair County
 Riverside, Arizona, an unincorporated area in Arizona
 Riverside, California, a city 
 Riverside City College
 University of California, Riverside
 Riverside County, California, in Southern California
 Riverside, Connecticut, a neighborhood in Fairfield County
 Riverside, Delaware, an unincorporated community in New Castle County
 Riverside–11th Street Bridge is a district in Wilmington, Delaware
 Riverside, Jacksonville, Florida, a neighborhood
 Riverside (Miami), a neighborhood in Miami-Dade County, Florida
 Riverside, Georgia (disambiguation), several places
 Riverside, Idaho (disambiguation), several communities
 Riverside, Illinois, a suburban village in Cook County
 Riverside, Indiana (disambiguation), several places
 Riverside, Iowa, a city in Washington County
 Riverside, Wichita, Kansas, a neighborhood Wichita
 Riverside, Kentucky, an unincorporated community in Warren County
 Riverside, The Farnsley-Moremen Landing, a historic farm and mansion in Louisville, Kentucky
 Riverside, Maryland (disambiguation), several communities 
 Riverside, Cambridge, a neighborhood in Massachusetts
 Riverside, Michigan, an unincorporated community in Hagar Township, Berrien County
 Riverside, part of Depot Town in Ypsilanti, Michigan
 Riverside (Duluth), a neighborhood in Duluth, Minnesota
 Riverside, Forrest County, Mississippi, a ghost town
 Riverside, Lafayette County, Mississippi, a ghost town
 Riverside, Missouri, a city in Platte County
 Riverside, Jefferson County, Missouri, an unincorporated community
 Riverside, Reynolds County, Missouri, a ghost town
 Riverside, Montana, an unincorporated community in Ravalli County
 Riverside (Hamilton, Montana), an historic house in Ravalli County
 Riverside, Nebraska, a ghost town in Burt County
 Riverside, Nevada, an unincorporated community in Clark County
 Riverside, New Jersey (disambiguation), several places
 Riverside, New Mexico (disambiguation), several communities
 Riverside, New York (disambiguation), several communities
 Riverside (house), a mansion on the Upper West Side of New York City, New York
 Riverside (Grandin, North Carolina), a historic home in Caldwell County
 Riverside (New England, North Dakota), a historic hotel
 Riverside, Ohio, a city in Montgomery County
 Riverside, Cincinnati, a former village in Hamilton County, Ohio; now a neighborhood in Cincinnati, Ohio
 Riverside, Oregon (disambiguation), several communities
 Riverside, Cambria County, Pennsylvania, an unincorporated community and census-designated place
 Riverside, Pennsylvania, a borough in Northumberland County
 Riverside, Rhode Island, a neighborhood in East Providence
 Riverside, South Dakota, an unincorporated community in Hanson County
 Riverside, Houston, a neighborhood in Houston, Texas
 Riverside, Texas, a city in Walker County
 Riverside, South Memphis, a neighborhood in South Memphis, Tennessee
 Riverside, Utah, a census-designated place in Box Elder County
 Riverside (Lyndonville, Vermont), an historic house in Caledonia County
 Riverside, Virginia, an unincorporated community in Roanoke County
 Riverside (Front Royal, Virginia), an historic home in Warren County
 Riverside, Spokane, a neighborhood in Spokane, Washington
 Riverside, Washington, a town in Okanogan County
 Riverside, West Virginia (disambiguation), several communities
 Riverside, Burnett County, Wisconsin, an unincorporated community in the town of Blaine
 Riverside, Lafayette County, Wisconsin, an unincorporated community in the town of Gratiot
 Riverside, Wyoming, a town in Carbon County

Multiple states 
 Riverside Township (disambiguation), many places in many states

Music 
 Riverside (band), a Polish progressive metal/rock band
 Riverside (Dave Douglas album), released in 2014
 "Riverside" (song), released by Dutch DJ Sidney Samson in 2009
 "Riverside" (Agnes Obel song)
 "Riverside", a song by America on the 1971 album America
 "Riverside", a song by Status Quo on the 1981 album Never Too Late

Other uses
 4871 Riverside, an asteroid
 Beverly Toon House, a house in Franklin, Tennessee, also called Riverside
 Riverside, a series of fantasy novels by Ellen Kushner
 The Riverside, English name for the defunct Filipino TV series Tabing Ilog
 Riverside (brand), a store brand of motorcycles, mopeds and scooters sold by Montgomery Ward
 Riverside Christian College, school in Maryborough West, Queensland, Australia
 Riverside Insights, an American book and test publisher

See also

 Riverside Cemetery (disambiguation)
 Riverside Garden (disambiguation)
 Riverside High School (disambiguation)
 Riverside Hotel (disambiguation)
 Riverside Mall (disambiguation)
 Riverside Park (disambiguation)
 Riverside Stadium (disambiguation)
 Riverside Station (disambiguation)
 Riverside Theater (disambiguation)
 Riverside Theatre (disambiguation)
 
 
 Creekside (disambiguation)
 Riverbank (disambiguation)
 River (disambiguation)
 Side (disambiguation)